Science Hall was an unincorporated community in Jasper County, Texas.  It is located on Farm to Market Road 777 and U.S. Highway 190.

History 
Science Hall was formerly a school community.  By 1986, the town was closely identified with the nearby town of Beech Grove.  A convenience store remained at that time at the cross road.

Education 
Jasper Independent School District serves students.

References 

Geography of Jasper County, Texas